Matt's Scooter (1985 – June 30, 2014) was a Standardbred pacer and sire who was named Harness Horse of the Year in 1989. Matt's Scooter competed as a pacer in harness racing, winning the Meadowlands Pace, Prix d'Été, Confederation Cup, Messenger Stakes, American National Stakes, Breeders Crown, Driscoll Series, Mohawk Gold Cup, he was named Pacer of the Year in 1988 and 1989, and Harness Horse of the Year in 1989 by the United States Harness Association.

Background
Matt's Scooter was a bay ridgeling bred by Max Gerson of New York. He was sired by Direct Scooter out of Ellen's Glory by Meadow Skipper. As a yearling, he was bought for $17,500 by Gordon and Illa Rumpel of Calgary, and Charles Juravinski. He was trained by Harry Poulton at his base near Lake Scugog, Ontario.

Racing career
As  two-year-old, Matt's Scooter was given a relatively light campaign winning three of his nine races. He was not an easy horse to handle: Poulton described him as "always bucking, kicking or doing something... he wanted to do everything 100 miles an hour".

In 1988, despite being ineligible for the Cane Pace and the Little Brown Jug, Matt's Scooter earned $1.78 million winning eleven of his twenty two races. His major victories included the Meadowlands Pace and the Messenger Stakes.

In Autumn 1988, he paced a mile in 1:48.2 at the Red Mile in Lexington, Kentucky, lowering the world record previously held by Niatross, by four-fifths of a second.

As a four-year-old he won 23 of his thirty races and earned $1.14 million.

Honors and awards
Matt's Scooter was named Pacer of the Year and best three-year-old in 1988. In the following year, he was again named best pacer and was awarded the title of Harness Horse of the Year. Matt's Scooter was inducted into the Canadian Horse Racing Hall of Fame and the United States Horse Racing Hall of Fame in 2006.

Retirement and stud career
He was retired from racing after 4 years, and stood as a breeding stallion for Perretti Farms in Cream Ridge, New Jersey. He was pensioned from stud duty in 2011. Bob Marks of Perretti Farms said "His libido is willing, but with his hind suspensory, we're afraid he could hurt himself".

Matt's Scooter was euthanised at Mid-Atlantic Equine Clinic in Ringoes, New Jersey on June 30, 2014.

Pedigree

References

1985 racehorse births
2014 racehorse deaths
American Standardbred racehorses
American Champion harness horses
Harness Horse of the Year winners
Harness racing in Canada
Harness racing in the United States
Canadian Horse Racing Hall of Fame inductees
United States Harness Racing Hall of Fame inductees
Messenger Stakes winners